Independent Liberal is a description allowed in politics to denote party affiliation.  It is used to designate a politician as a liberal, yet independent of the official Liberal Party of a country. Those parties were the Liberal Party of Canada, or the Liberal Party of the United Kingdom, or the New Zealand Liberal Party.

Canada
Independent Liberal Members of Parliament (or of the Canadian Senate or a provincial legislative assembly) are typically former Liberal caucus members who were either expelled from the Liberal Party caucus or resigned the whip due to a political disagreement. More recent examples, include Don Johnston who sat as an Independent Liberal from January 18, 1988 until the adjournment of parliament due to his resignation from the Liberal caucus as a result of his support of the Canada–United States Free Trade Agreement which the party opposed, Jag Bhaduria who sat as an Independent Liberal from 1994 to 1996 following his expulsion from the Liberal caucus and Dennis Mills who briefly left the Liberal caucus in 1996 to sit as an "Independent Liberal" to protest the Liberal government's failure to abolish the Goods and Services Tax (GST).

Independent Liberal candidates for parliament or the legislature have been those who generally subscribe to Liberal Party principles but either have not been selected as an official Liberal Party candidate or decline to seek the party's nomination due to a disagreement with the party on certain issues. Under the current Elections Act a candidate who is not affiliated with a political party can only describe themselves on the ballot as Independent or "No Affiliation" and cannot describe themselves in terms of an existing political party. Accordingly, no candidate for the House of Commons of Canada has officially designated themselves an "Independent Liberal" since the 1968 federal election and no Independent Liberal candidate has been elected to the House of Commons since the 1957 federal election.

A number of Quebec Liberal MPs left the party and sat as Independent Liberals as a result of the Conscription Crisis of 1944 as they opposed the Liberal government's decision to implement conscription. The most prominent of these was Charles Gavan Power who resigned from Cabinet over the issue. Several ran for re-election in the 1945 federal election as Independent Liberals. William Lyon Mackenzie King's government was returned with only a minority of Liberal MPs in parliament but was able to govern as a majority government with the support of Independent Liberal MPs, most of whom rejoined the party in the course of the parliament.

United Kingdom
Independent Liberal is a description once used in British politics to denote a form of non-party affiliation.  It was used to designate a politician as a Liberal who was independent of any political party, particularly of the Liberal Party before its  transformation in the 1980s into the Liberal Democrats.

Since the Registration of Political Parties Act 1998 came into force, a candidate for election can no longer be described as an "Independent Liberal" on a ballot paper, as the 1998 Act prohibits any description which could cause confusion with a registered political party. In practice, the description used is either the name of a registered party or the word "Independent".

New Zealand
Independent Liberal was a definition in New Zealand politics in the late 19th and early 20th Centuries for Independents that aligned themselves with the New Zealand Liberal Party. It is often difficult to determine whether candidates were official Liberal or Independent Liberal and many electorates had more Liberal candidates standing than seats available. From  to  the New Zealand Liberal Party was the only formalised political party to win any seats in parliament.

Political terminology in Canada

Political terminology
Liberalism in the United Kingdom
Independent politicians in the United Kingdom